The Great Public Schools Association of Queensland Inc. (GPS) is an association of nine south-east Queensland secondary schools established in 1918. With the exception of Brisbane State High School, GPS schools are all-male, private schools. Similar associations exist in New South Wales (AAGPS) and Victoria (APS).

Schools

Current member schools 
There have been critics of the GPS competition of Brisbane State High's membership to the GPS Competition, primarily because it is the only Public School in the GPS competition. However, its membership is maintained despite dispute. The term "Public Schools" in the GPS acronym encompasses all public education including the Grammar Schools who are indeed themselves Public Schools. (Grammar Schools Act, 1860)

Former member schools 

Central Technical College High School, a Government-run school, was initially a member from 1918 but merged with Brisbane Junior State High School and High Top Wynnum State School in 1921* to form Brisbane State High School, which is still a member of the association.

St. Laurence's College was forced to leave the GPS in the 1920s because it did not have a cricket pitch and a football oval. They competed at least up to and including the September 23, 1928 Athletics Carnival. They are now members of the Associated Independent Colleges (AIC) Competition.

Physical recreation

Basketball 

The schools have competed in an annual basketball premiership since 1986. A summary of First V winners appears below. For a full list of premiers by year, see http://www.gpsqld.org.au/.

Notes

 Results up to and including 2022 season.
Brisbane State High School has been the most successful school in GPS Basketball based upon premierships.

LIST OF GPS Basketball 1st V PREMIERS:

1986 Ipswich Grammar School

1987 Brisbane Boys' College

1988 Anglican Church Grammar School

1989 Anglican Church Grammar School

1990 Anglican Church Grammar School & Nudgee College (tie)

1991 Nudgee College & Ipswich Grammar School (tie)
 
1992 Nudgee College & Ipswich Grammar School (tie)

1993 Ipswich Grammar School

1994 Ipswich Grammar School

1995 Brisbane Boys' College

1996 Ipswich Grammar School

1997 Gregory Terrace

1998 Brisbane State High School & Nudgee College (tie)

1999 Brisbane State High School

2000 Brisbane State High School & Gregory Terrace (tie)

2001 Nudgee College

2002 Brisbane State High School

2003 Nudgee College

2004 Brisbane State High School & Gregory Terrace (tie)

2005 Brisbane Boys' College

2006 Brisbane State High School

2007 Brisbane State High School

2008 Anglican Church Grammar School

2009 The Southport School

2010 Brisbane State High School

2011 Brisbane State High School & Brisbane Boys' College (tie)

2012 The Southport School

2013 Anglican Church Grammar School

2014 Anglican Church Grammar School

2015 Ipswich Grammar School

2016 Brisbane State High School

2017 Brisbane Boys' College

2018 Ipswich Grammar School

2019 Gregory Terrace & Anglican Church Grammar School (tie)

2020 Anglican Church Grammar School

2021 The Southport School

2022 Brisbane State High School, Toowoomba Grammar School & The Southport School (tie)

Cricket 

The schools have competed in an annual cricket premiership since 1919. A summary of First XI winners appears below.

Notes
 No competition held from 1942 to 1945 inclusive due to World War II.
 Current Premiers (2022): Brisbane Grammar School
 Results up to and including 2022 season.
The Southport School has been the most successful school in GPS Cricket based upon premierships.

LIST OF GPS 1st XI CRICKET PREMIERS:

1919 Brisbane Grammar School

1920 Brisbane Grammar School & The Southport School (tie)

1921 Brisbane Grammar School

1922 Ipswich Grammar School & Nudgee College (tie)

1923 Toowoomba Grammar School & The Southport School (tie)

1924 Toowoomba Grammar School

1925 Nudgee College

1926 The Southport School

1927 The Southport School

1928 Toowoomba Grammar School & The Southport School (tie)

1929 Church of England Grammar School & The Southport School (tie)

1930 Brisbane Grammar School

1931 Brisbane Grammar School & Church of England Grammar School (tie)

1932 Toowoomba Grammar School

1933 Toowoomba Grammar School

1934 Church of England Grammar School

1935 Church of England Grammar School

1936 Toowoomba Grammar School

1937 Ipswich Grammar School

1938 Nudgee College

1939 Nudgee College

1940 Church of England Grammar School

1941 Church of England Grammar School

1942 to 1945 No Competitions (World War II)

1946 Brisbane Grammar School

1947 Brisbane Boys’ College

1948 Church of England Grammar School

1949 Brisbane State High School

1950 Church of England Grammar School

1951 Brisbane Grammar School

1952 Gregory Terrace

1953 Ipswich Grammar School

1954 Brisbane Grammar School

1955 Brisbane Grammar School & Church of England Grammar School (tie)

1956 Brisbane Grammar School

1957 Ipswich Grammar School

1958 Ipswich Grammar School

1959 Church of England Grammar School

1960 Brisbane Grammar School

1961 Brisbane Grammar School

1962 Brisbane Boys’ College & Church of England Grammar School (tie)

1963 Church of England Grammar School

1964 Nudgee College

1965 Brisbane Grammar School

1966 Brisbane State High School

1967 Church of England Grammar School

1968 Ipswich Grammar School

1969 Ipswich Grammar School

1970 The Southport School

1971 The Southport School & Brisbane Grammar School (tie)

1972 The Southport School

1973 The Southport School

1974 The Southport School

1975 Ipswich Grammar School

1976 Church of England Grammar School

1977 Brisbane State High School

1978 Brisbane Grammar School

1979 Brisbane State High School

1980 The Southport School

1981 The Southport School

1982 The Southport School

1983 Brisbane Grammar School

1984 Church of England Grammar School

1985 Brisbane Boys’ College

1986 Toowoomba Grammar School

1987 Toowoomba Grammar School

1988 Toowoomba Grammar School

1989 Ipswich Grammar School

1990 Toowoomba Grammar School

1991 Nudgee College

1992 Brisbane State High School

1993 Brisbane State High School

1994 Nudgee College

1995 Brisbane Boys’ College

1996 Anglican Church Grammar School

1997 Anglican Church Grammar School]

1998 Nudgee College

1999 Anglican Church Grammar School

2000 Toowoomba Grammar School

2001 Nudgee College

2002 Brisbane State High School

2003 Brisbane Boys’ College

2004 Gregory Terrace

2005 Toowoomba Grammar School

2006 Ipswich Grammar School

2007 Ipswich Grammar School

2008 Ipswich Grammar School

2009 Nudgee College

2010 The Southport School

2011 The Southport School

2012 Anglican Church Grammar School

2013 Brisbane Grammar School

2014 The Southport School

2015 The Southport School

2016 Ipswich Grammar school

2017 The Southport School

2018 The Southport School

2019 The Southport school

2020 Gregory Terrace & Brisbane Boys' College (tie)

2021 The Southport School

2022 Brisbane Grammar School

Cross Country 

The schools have competed in an annual cross-country championship since 1971. A summary of winners appears below. For a full list of premiers by year, see http://www.gpsqld.org.au/.

Notes
 Current Premiers (2022): Brisbane Boys' College
 Results up to and including 2022 competition.
Anglican Church Grammar School has been the most successful school in Junior GPS Cross Country based upon premierships.

GPS CROSS COUNTRY PREMIERSHIPS

1971 Church of England Grammar School

1972 Church of England Grammar School

1973 Church of England Grammar School

1974 Brisbane Grammar School

1975 Brisbane Grammar School & Church of England Grammar School (tie)

1976 Church of England Grammar School

1977 Church of England Grammar School

1978 Church of England Grammar School

1979 Brisbane Grammar School

1980 Church of England Grammar School

1981 Brisbane Grammar School

1982 Brisbane Grammar School

1983 Church of England Grammar School

1984 Brisbane Grammar School

1985 Anglican Church of Grammar School

1986 Anglican Church of Grammar School

1987 Anglican Church of Grammar School

1988 Anglican Church of Grammar School

1989 Anglican Church of Grammar School

1990 The Southport School

1991 Ipswich Grammar School

1992 Ipswich Grammar School

1993 Brisbane Grammar School

1994 Brisbane Grammar School

1995 Brisbane Grammar School

1996  Brisbane Grammar School

1997 Brisbane Grammar School

1998 Brisbane Grammar School

1999 Nudgee College

2000 Brisbane Grammar School

2001 Gregory Terrace

2002 Gregory Terrace

2003 Gregory Terrace

2004 Gregory Terrace & Ipswich Grammar School (tie)

2005 Nudgee College

2006 Brisbane Grammar School

2007 Anglican Church Grammar School & Ipswich Grammar School (tie)

2008 Gregory Terrace

2009 Anglican Church Grammar School

2010 Gregory Terrace & Nudgee College (tie)

2011 Gregory Terrace

2012 Anglican Church Grammar School

2013 Gregory Terrace

2014 Gregory Terrace

2015 Nudgee College

2016 Brisbane Grammar School

2017 Brisbane Grammar School

2018 Brisbane Boys' College

2019 Brisbane Boys' College

2020 Brisbane State High School

2021 Brisbane State High School

2022 Brisbane Boys' College

Junior Cross Country 

The schools have competed in an annual cross-country championship since 2014. A summary of winners appears below. For a full list of premiers by year, see http://www.gpsqld.org.au/.

Notes
 Current Premiers (2022): Anglican Church Grammar School
 Results up to and including 2022 competition.
Nudgee College has been the most successful school in Junior GPS Cross Country based upon premierships.

JUNIOR GPS CROSS COUNTRY PREMIERSHIPS

2014 Anglican Church Grammar School

2015 Nudgee College

2016 Nudgee College

2017 Nudgee College

2018 Nudgee College

2019 Anglican Church Grammar School & Nudgee College (tie)

2020 Nudgee College

2021 Nudgee College

2022 Anglican Church Grammar School

Gymnastics 

The schools have competed in an annual gymnastics competition from 1915 to 2021, making it the oldest GPS sport, dating before the establishment of the GPS Association in 1918. A summary of winners appears below. For a full list of premiers by year, see http://www.gpsqld.org.au/.

Notes
 Ipswich Grammar School has never competed in gymnastics. Anglican Church Grammar School, Toowoomba Grammar School and Nudgee College no longer consistently compete in gymnastics (occasionally, small teams/individuals have represented these schools at the championships).
 Although never officially involved, Brisbane State High School has occasionally is involved with few individuals. 
 Gymnastics was contested between schools in 1915, 1916 and 1917, prior to the founding of the GPS in 1918, with Brisbane Grammar School, Nudgee College and Brisbane Grammar School winning in the respective years
 No competition in 1924 or from 1929 to 1932 inclusive.
 Results up to and including 2022 competition.
 Brisbane Grammar School in 2012 won Division 3 by 0.5 points and Division 1 by 0.1 points, while losing Division 2 by over 20.0 points.  It has been unofficially dubbed one of the greatest premierships in GPS history.
Brisbane Grammar School has been the most successful school in GPS Gymnastics based upon premierships.
Brisbane Grammar School has over a decade-long premiership, winning all championships from 2011 and 2022.
GPS Gymnastics has been officially discontinued after the 2020 GPS Championships on September 5, ending with a 105 year history.  This was due to a continuing decline of participating students and viable competition across all schools, making GPS Gymnastics one of three sports to be discontinued by the GPS Association.  
The GPS Gymnastics Foundation Cup has been contested since 2021

Rowing 
The schools have competed in an annual Head of the River rowing championship since 1918. A summary of winning Eights crews (Fours from 1918 to 1954 inclusive) appears below. For individual results, see GPS Head of the River - Queensland.

Notes
 Ipswich Grammar School and Toowoomba Grammar School do not take part in rowing competition.
 Gregory Terrace first competed in 1928 but did not compete again until 1954.
 Nudgee College first competed in 2002.
 No competition 1942 to 1945 inclusive due to World War II.
 There have been 2 ties for first place - 1928 and 1965.
In all, there have been 5 ties for a podium (1st, 2nd, or 3rd) position; the most recent of which was for 3rd in the 2019 race.
 A "No Race" was declared in 1983 due to multiple protests regarding the outcome of the race.
 Results up to and including 2023.
Brisbane Boys' College has been the most successful school in GPS Rowing based upon 1st VIII premierships.

The schools have also competed for the Old Boys Cup for best overall school at Head of the River since 1988. A summary of winning Schools appears below. For individual results, see GPS Head of the River - Queensland.

Notes
 There has been 1 tie for first place - 2012.
 Not awarded in 2010 due to inclement weather conditions.
 Results up to and including 2023.
Anglican Church Grammar School has been the most successful school in the Old Boys' Cup.

Rugby 

The schools have competed in an annual rugby premiership since 1918 (initially playing rugby league until 1928, when the schools reverted to rugby union).

List of GPS rugby XV premiers 

Notes
 Premiers are determined by win–loss records only and not by bonus points or points differential.
St. Joseph's College, Nudgee has been the most successful school in GPS Rugby based upon premierships.

Sailing 
An annual sailing competition was instigated in 2000. A summary of winners appears below. For a full list of winners by year, see http://www.gpsqld.org.au/.

Notes
 Brisbane State High School, Gregory Terrace, Nudgee College, Toowoomba Grammar School and Ipswich Grammar School do not compete in sailing.
 Not awarded in 2012 due to bad weather.
 Not awarded in 2020 due to COVID-19
 Up to and including 2022.
The Southport School has been the most successful school in GPS Sailing based upon premierships.
GPS Sailing has been officially discontinued after the 2020 GPS Championships, ending with a 21 year history. This was due to a continuing decline of participating students and viable competition across all schools, making GPS Sailing one of two sports to be discontinued by the GPS Association.
The GPS Sailing Foundation Cup has been contested since 2021

GPS SAILING PREMIERS

2000 Brisbane Grammar School

2001 Anglican Church Grammar School

2002 The Southport School

2003 The Southport School

2004 Anglican Church Grammar School

2005 Brisbane Grammar School

2006 Brisbane Grammar School

2007 Brisbane Boys' College

2008 Brisbane Boys' College

2009 Anglican Church Grammar School

2010 Anglican Church Grammar School

2011 Brisbane Boys' College

2012 Not awarded as all races were not conducted due to weather

2013 Brisbane Grammar School

2014 The Southport School

2015 The Southport School

2016 The Southport School

2017 The Southport School

2018 The Southport School

2019 The Southport School

2020 Not awarded as championships were cancelled due to COVID-19

2021 The Southport School

2022 Brisbane Grammar School

Football 
The schools have competed in an annual Association football competition since 1991. A summary of winners appears below. For a full list of winners by year, see http://www.gpsqld.org.au/.

Notes
 Current Premiers (2022): St Joseph's Nudgee College
 Up to and including 2022.
St. Joseph's Nudgee College have been the most successful schools in GPS Football based upon premierships.

GPS FOOTBALL 1st XI PREMIERS

1991 Brisbane Boys’ College

1992 Brisbane Grammar School

1993 Brisbane Boys’ College

1994 Brisbane Grammar School

1995 St Joseph's Nudgee College

1996 Ipswich Grammar School

1997 St Joseph's Nudgee College

1998 Ipswich Grammar School & St Joseph's Nudgee College (tie)

1999 Brisbane Grammar School & Ipswich Grammar School (tie)

2000 Brisbane Grammar School

2001 St Joseph's Nudgee College

2002 Ipswich Grammar School

2003 St Joseph's Nudgee College

2004 Brisbane Boys' College

2005 Brisbane State High School

2006 Brisbane Grammar School & Brisbane State High School (tie)

2007 Brisbane Grammar School

2008 Ipswich Grammar School

2009 Ipswich Grammar School

2010 Brisbane Boys' College

2011 Brisbane Boys' College

2012 The Southport School

2013 St Joseph's Nudgee College & The Southport School (tie)

2014 St Joseph's Nudgee College & The Southport School (tie)

2015 Toowoomba Grammar School

2016 St Joseph' Nudgee College & Toowoomba Grammar School

2017 Ipswich Grammar School

2018 St Joseph's Nudgee College

2019 Anglican Church Grammar School

2020 The Southport School

2021 St Joseph’s College, Gregory Terrace

2022 St Joseph’s Nudgee College

Swimming 

The schools have competed in an annual swimming competition since 1918. A summary of winners appears below. For a full list of winners by year, see http://www.gpsqld.org.au/.

Notes
 No competition took place in 1932, 1938, 1942, 1951, 1966 or 1967.
 Up to and including 2023.
Nudgee College has been the most successful school in GPS Swimming based upon premierships.

GPS SWIMMING PREMIERSHIPS

1918 Gregory Terrace

1919 Gregory Terrace

1920 Brisbane Grammar School

1921 Gregory Terrace

1922 The Southport School

1923 Nudgee College

1924 Brisbane Grammar School

1925 Brisbane Grammar School

1926 Brisbane Grammar School

1927 Brisbane Grammar School

1928 Brisbane Grammar School

1929 Brisbane Grammar School

1930 Church of England Grammar School

1931 Brisbane Grammar School

1932 No Competition

1933 Brisbane State High School

1934 Brisbane Grammar School

1935 Toowoomba Grammar School

1936 Brisbane Grammar School

1937 Church of England Grammar School

1938 No Competition

1939 Church of England Grammar School

1940 Church of England Grammar School

1941 Church of England Grammar School

1942 No Competition

1943 Church of England Grammar School

1944 Church of England Grammar School

1945 Church of England Grammar School

1946 Church of England Grammar School

1947 Church of England Grammar School

1948 Church of England Grammar School

1949 Church of England Grammar School

1950 Church of England Grammar School

1951 No Competition

1952 Gregory Terrace

1953 Gregory Terrace

1954 Nudgee College & Gregory Terrace (tie)

1955 Gregory Terrace

1956 Church of England Grammar School

1957 Gregory Terrace

1958 Gregory Terrace

1959 Gregory Terrace

1960 Church of England Grammar School

1961 Church of England Grammar School

1962 Church of England Grammar School

1963 Church of England Grammar School

1984 Church of England Grammar School

1965 Church of England Grammar School

1966 to 1967 No Competition

1968 Brisbane State High School

1969 Brisbane State High School

1970 Gregory Terrace

1971 Brisbane Grammar School

1972 Brisbane Grammar School

1973 Brisbane Grammar School

1974 Brisbane Grammar School

1975 Brisbane Grammar School

1976 Brisbane Grammar School

1977 Brisbane Grammar School

1978 Brisbane State High School

1979 Brisbane State High School

1980 Brisbane State High School

1981 Brisbane State High School

1982 Brisbane State High School

1983 Brisbane State High School

1984 Brisbane State High School

1985 Brisbane State High School

1986 Brisbane State High School

1987 Gregory Terrace

1988 Gregory Terrace

1989 Gregory Terrace

1990 Gregory Terrace

1991 Gregory Terrace

1992 Nudgee College

1993 Nudgee College

1994 Nudgee College

1995 Nudgee College

1996 Nudgee College

1997 Nudgee College

1998 Nudgee College

1999 Nudgee College

2000 Nudgee College

2001 Nudgee College

2002 Nudgee College

2003 Nudgee College

2004 The Southport School

2005 The Southport School

2006 Nudgee College

2007 The Southport School

2008 The Southport School

2009 Nudgee College

2010 Nudgee College

2011 Nudgee College

2012 Nudgee College

2013 The Southport School

2014 Anglican Church Grammar School

2015 The Southport School

2016 The Southport School

2017 Brisbane Grammar School

2018 Brisbane Grammar School

2019 Nudgee College

2020 Nudgee College

2021 Nudgee College

2022 Brisbane Grammar School

2023 Nudgee College

Junior Swimming 

The schools have competed in an annual swimming competition since 2014. A summary of winners appears below. For a full list of winners by year, see http://www.gpsqld.org.au/.

Notes
 Up to and including 2023.
Anglican Church Grammar School has been the most successful school in Junior GPS Swimming based upon premierships.

JUNIOR GPS SWIMMING PREMIERSHIPS

2014 Anglican Church Grammar School

2015 Anglican Church Grammar School

2016 The Southport School

2017 Brisbane Boys College

2018 Gregory Terrace

2019 Nudgee College

2020 Anglican Church Grammar School

2021 Anglican Church Grammar School

2022 Nudgee College

2023 Nudgee College

Tennis 

The schools have competed in an annual Tennis competition since 1918. A summary of First IV winners appears below. For a full list of winners by year, see http://www.gpsqld.org.au/.

Notes
 No competition took place from 1945 to 1945 inclusive due to World War II.
 Up to and including 2022.
Brisbane Grammar School has been the most successful school in GPS Tennis based upon premierships.

GPS 1st IV PREMIERSHIPS

1918 Brisbane Grammar School

1919 Brisbane Grammar School

1920 Brisbane Grammar School

1921 Brisbane Grammar School, Ipswich Grammar School, The Southport School (tie)

1922 Brisbane Grammar School

1923 Brisbane Grammar School

1924 The Southport School

1925 Brisbane Grammar School

1926 The Southport School

1927 Toowoomba Grammar School

1928 Brisbane Grammar School

1929 Ipswich Grammar School

1930 The Southport School

1931 Brisbane Grammar School

1932 Toowoomba Grammar School

1933 Brisbane Grammar School

1934 Brisbane Boys’ College, Brisbane Grammar School,  The Southport School (tie)

1935 Nudgee College

1936 Nudgee College

1937 Toowoomba Grammar School

1938 Toowoomba Grammar School

1939 Toowoomba Grammar School

1940 Toowoomba Grammar School

1941 Church of England Grammar School, Ipswich Grammar School (tie)

1942 to 1945 No Competitions

1946 Toowoomba Grammar School

1947 Toowoomba Grammar School

1948 Church of England Grammar School, Toowoomba Grammar School (tie)

1949 Toowoomba Grammar School

1950 Brisbane Grammar School

1951  Brisbane Grammar School

1952 Toowoomba Grammar School

1953 Brisbane Grammar School

1954 Brisbane State High School

1955 Gregory Terrace

1956 The Southport School

1957 Church of England Grammar School, Toowoomba Grammar School (tie)

1958 Church of England Grammar School

1959 Brisbane State High School

1960 Church of England Grammar School

1961 Church of England Grammar School

1962 Church of England Grammar School

1963 Brisbane Grammar School

1964 Brisbane Grammar School

1965 Brisbane Grammar School

1966 Brisbane Grammar School

1967 Brisbane Grammar School

1968 Brisbane Grammar School

1969 Brisbane Grammar School

1970 Brisbane Grammar School

1971 Brisbane Grammar School

1972 Brisbane Grammar School & Brisbane State High School (tie)

1973 Brisbane State High School

1974 Brisbane Grammar School

1975 Brisbane Grammar School

1976 Brisbane Grammar School

1977 Brisbane Grammar School

1978 Brisbane Grammar School

1979 Brisbane Grammar School

1980 Brisbane Grammar School

1981 Brisbane Grammar School

1982 Brisbane Grammar School

1983 Brisbane Boys’ College

1984 Brisbane State High School

1985 Brisbane Grammar School

1986 Brisbane Grammar School

1987 Brisbane Boys’ College

1988 Nudgee College

1989 Nudgee College

1990 Nudgee College

1991 Brisbane Grammar School

1992 Gregory Terrace

1993 Nudgee College

1994 Nudgee College

1995 Gregory Terrace

1996 Anglican Church Grammar School

1997 Anglican Church Grammar School

1998 Gregory Terrace

1999 Gregory Terrace

2000 The Southport School

2001 The Southport School

2002 Ipswich Grammar School & Gregory Terrace (tie)

2003 Brisbane Grammar School, Gregory Terrace, Nudgee College (tie)

2004 Anglican Church Grammar School

2005 Anglican Church Grammar School

2006 Brisbane Boys’ College

2007 Brisbane Boys’ College

2008 Brisbane Boys’ College

2009 Brisbane Grammar School & Ipswich Grammar School (tie)

2010 Ipswich Grammar School

2011 Brisbane Boys' College, Brisbane Grammar School & Nudgee College (tie)

2012 Brisbane Grammar School

2013 Brisbane Boys' College, Brisbane Grammar School & Nudgee College (tie)

2014 Brisbane Boys' College

2015 Brisbane Boys' College

2016 Brisbane Boys' College

2017 Brisbane Boys' College

2018 The Southport School, Brisbane Boys' College (tie)

2019 Brisbane Boys’ College

2020 Brisbane Boys’ College

2021 Brisbane Grammar School

2022 Brisbane Grammar School

Track and Field 

The schools have competed in an annual athletics competition since 1918. A summary of winners appears below. For a full list of winners by year, see http://www.gpsqld.org.au/.

Notes
 Up to and including 2022
Ipswich Grammar School has been the most successful school in GPS Track & Field based upon premierships.

GPS TRACK & FIELD PREMIERSHIPS

1918  The Southport School

1919  The Southport School & Nudgee College (tie)

1920  Nudgee College

1921  Nudgee College

1922  The Southport School

1923  Church of England Grammar School

1924  Brisbane Grammar School

1925  Brisbane Boys’ College

1926  Brisbane Grammar School

1927  Gregory Terrace

1928  Brisbane Grammar School

1929  The Southport School & Church of England Grammar School (tie)

1930  Gregory Terrace

1931  Nudgee College

1932  Brisbane Grammar School

1933  The Southport School

1934  Gregory Terrace

1935  Brisbane Grammar School & Church of England Grammar School (tie)

1936  Brisbane Grammar School

1937  Brisbane Grammar School

1938  Brisbane Grammar School

1939  Brisbane Boys’ College

1940  Nudgee College

1941  Brisbane Grammar School

1942  Brisbane Boys’ College

1943  Church of England Grammar School

1944  Church of England Grammar School

1945  Toowoomba Grammar School

1946  Brisbane State High School

1947  Brisbane State High School

1948  Brisbane Grammar School

1949  Church of England Grammar School

1950  Gregory Terrace

1951  Gregory Terrace

1952  Church of England Grammar School

1953  Church of England Grammar School

1954  Church of England Grammar School

1955  Nudgee College

1956  Church of England Grammar School

1957  Church of England Grammar School

1958  Church of England Grammar School

1959  Church of England Grammar School

1960  Church of England Grammar School

1961  Church of England Grammar School

1962  Church of England Grammar School

1963  Church of England Grammar School

1964  Church of England Grammar School

1965  Church of England Grammar School

1966  Brisbane State High School

1967  Brisbane State High School

1968  Brisbane State High School

1969  Nudgee College

1970  Nudgee College

1971  Toowoomba Grammar School

1972  Toowoomba Grammar School

1973  Church of England Grammar School

1974  Church of England Grammar School

1975  Brisbane State High School

1976  Brisbane State High School

1977  Brisbane State High School

1978  Brisbane State High School

1979  Brisbane State High School

1980  Brisbane State High School

1981  Brisbane State High School

1982  Brisbane State High School

1983  Brisbane State High School

1984  Ipswich Grammar School

1985  Ipswich Grammar School

1986  Ipswich Grammar School

1987  Ipswich Grammar School

1988  Brisbane Grammar School

1989  Brisbane Grammar School

1990  Ipswich Grammar School

1991  Ipswich Grammar School

1992  Ipswich Grammar School

1993  Nudgee College

1994  Brisbane Grammar School

1995  Brisbane Grammar School

1996  Nudgee College

1997  Nudgee College

1998  Ipswich Grammar School

1999  Ipswich Grammar School

2000  Ipswich Grammar School

2001  Ipswich Grammar School

2002  Ipswich Grammar School

2003  Ipswich Grammar School

2004  Ipswich Grammar School

2005  Ipswich Grammar School

2006  Nudgee College

2007  Ipswich Grammar School

2008  Ipswich Grammar School

2009  Ipswich Grammar School

2010  Nudgee College

2011  Ipswich Grammar School

2012  Ipswich Grammar School

2013  Nudgee College

2014 Nudgee College

2015 Nudgee College

2016 Brisbane Boys’ College

2017 Brisbane Boys’ College

2018 Brisbane Boys' College

2019 Ipswich Grammar School

2020 Ipswich Grammar School

2021 Nudgee College

2022 Ipswich Grammar School

Junior Track and Field 

The schools have competed in an annual athletics competition since 2014. A summary of winners appears below. For a full list of winners by year, see http://www.gpsqld.org.au/.

Notes

 Up to and including 2022
Nudgee College has been the most successful school in Junior GPS Track & Field based upon premierships.

JUNIOR GPS TRACK & FIELD PREMIERSHIPS

2014 Anglican Church Grammar School

2015 Nudgee College

2016 Brisbane Boys College

2017 Nudgee College

2018 Anglican Church Grammar School

2019 Nudgee College

2020 Nudgee College

2021 Nudgee College

2022 Nudgee College

Volleyball 
The schools have competed in an annual volleyball premiership since 1994. A summary of first team winners appears below. For a full list of winners by year, see http://www.gpsqld.org.au/.

Notes
 Up to and including 2022
 The Southport School do not take part in Volleyball
Brisbane Grammar School has been the most successful school in GPS Volleyball based upon premierships.

GPS VOLLEYBALL PREMIERSHIPS

1994 Brisbane Boys’ College

1995 Brisbane Boys’ College

1996 Brisbane Boys’ College & Gregory Terrace (tie)

1997 Gregory Terrace

1998 Anglican Church Grammar School

1999 Brisbane Boys’ College

2000 Brisbane Grammar School & Gregory Terrace (tie)

2001 Brisbane Boys’ College

2002 Ipswich Grammar School & Nudgee College (tie)

2003 Brisbane Grammar School

2004 Brisbane Grammar School

2005 Brisbane Grammar School

2006 Brisbane Grammar School

2007 Brisbane Grammar School

2008 Brisbane Grammar School

2009 Brisbane Grammar School

2010 Brisbane Grammar School & Gregory Terrace (tie)

2011 Brisbane Grammar School

2012 Brisbane Grammar School

2013 Brisbane Grammar School

2014 Gregory Terrace

2015 Brisbane Grammar School & Gregory Terrace (tie)

2016 Anglican Church Grammar School

2017 Anglican Church Grammar School

2018 Anglican Church Grammar School

2019 Brisbane Boys' College

2020 Anglican Church Grammar School, Brisbane Grammar School & Gregory Terrace (tie)

2021 Gregory Terrace

2022 Nudgee College

Former sports 
 Shooting (abandoned in 1974)

Academic Events

Chess 
The schools have competed in an annual chess premiership since 1995. A summary of first team winners appears below. For a full list of premiers by year, see http://www.gpsqld.org.au/.

Notes
 Results up to and including 2022 season.
Anglican Church Grammar School has been the most successful school in GPS Chess based upon premierships.

GPS CHESS CHAMPIONS

1995    Brisbane Grammar School

1996    Brisbane Grammar School

1997    Anglican Church Grammar School

1998    Anglican Church Grammar School

1999    Anglican Church Grammar School

2000    Anglican Church Grammar School

2001    Anglican Church Grammar School

2002    Anglican Church Grammar School

2003    Brisbane Grammar School

2004    Brisbane State High School

2005    Brisbane State High School

2006    Brisbane Grammar School & Toowoomba Grammar School (tie)

2007    Brisbane Grammar School

2008    Anglican Church Grammar School

2009    Brisbane Grammar School

2010    Anglican Church Grammar School & Brisbane Grammar School (tie)

2011    Brisbane Grammar School

2012    Brisbane Grammar School

2013    Brisbane Grammar School

2014    Brisbane Grammar School

2015    Anglican Church Grammar School

2016    Brisbane Grammar School

2017    Anglican Church Grammar School

2018    Anglican Church Grammar School

2019    Brisbane Grammar School

2020    Anglican Church Grammar School

2021    Anglican Church Grammar School

2022    Anglican Church Grammar School

Debating 
The schools have competed in an annual debating premiership since 2002. A summary of first team winners appears below. For a full list of premiers by year, see http://www.gpsqld.org.au/.

Notes
 Results up to and including 2022
Brisbane Grammar School has been the most successful school in GPS Debating based upon premierships.

GPS DEBATING CHAMPIONS

2002    St Joseph's Gregory Terrace & Brisbane Grammar School (tie)

2003    Brisbane Grammar School

2004    Brisbane Grammar School

2005    Brisbane Grammar School & St Joseph's Gregory Terrace (tie)

2006    St Joseph's Gregory Terrace

2007    Anglican Church Grammar School

2008    Brisbane Grammar School

2009    Brisbane Grammar School

2010    Brisbane Grammar School

2011    Brisbane Grammar School

2012    Anglican Church Grammar School

2013    Brisbane Grammar School

2014    Brisbane Grammar School

2015    Brisbane Grammar School

2016    Brisbane Grammar School

2017    Brisbane Grammar School

2018    Brisbane Grammar School

2019    St Joseph's Gregory Terrace

2020    Anglican Church Grammar School

2021    Brisbane Grammar School

2022    Anglican Church Grammar School

GPS Music Showcase 
The GPS Competition holds an Annual Music Showcase where member schools present a set repertoire that is decided by the school who is hosting for that particular year. Students then rehearse for a final concert which, in 2019, was held in the Queensland Performing Arts Centre (QPAC). The event celebrates the creative talent of students across all 9 of the member schools.

Additionally, there was previously GPS Shooting which got removed because of safety hazards. Toowoomba Grammar School had very many premierships in the time it was a GPS competition. When the GPS allowed you to enter 3 teams, Toowoomba Grammar School won 1st, 2nd and 3rd.

See also
Education in Australia
Queensland Girls' Secondary Schools Sports Association
Associated Independent Colleges
The Associated Schools
Athletic Association of the Great Public Schools of New South Wales
Associated Public Schools of Victoria

Notes
: Formerly known as Church of England Grammar School.
: Co-educational school.

References

Bibliography

External links

 Darcy Knows GPS
 BBC Chess Video
 St Joseph's Nudgee College - Steroids Use
 Anglican Church Grammar School - Cannabis Use
 GPS Memes [V.1]
 Toowoomba Grammar School - South African Rugby Tour

 
Australian schools associations
Education in Brisbane
Australian school sports associations